Asande Baninzi (born 1983) is a South African serial killer.

Baninzi claimed 18 lives between June and August 2001. He was convicted of fourteen murders, four rapes and two armed robberies. In addition to 19 life sentences, he was sentenced to 189 years' imprisonment.

Baninzi, currently serving four life sentences for the murder of a family of four living in Delft, in the Cape Flats, pleaded guilty to all his convictions. Mthutuzeli Nombewu, accomplice of Baninzi, committed suicide to avoid arrest.

See also 
 List of serial killers by country
 List of serial killers by number of victims

Notes and references 

1983 births
Family murders
Living people
Male serial killers
South African mass murderers
South African people convicted of rape
South African rapists
South African serial killers